KQOR (105.3 FM, "Classic Hits 105.3") is a radio station broadcasting a classic hits music format. Licensed to Mena, Arkansas, United States, the station is currently owned by Ouachita Broadcasting, Inc. and features programming from Westwood One.

References

External links

Classic hits radio stations in the United States
QOR
Polk County, Arkansas